Yankee Jims (also, Yankee Jim and Yankee Jim's) is a small community in Placer County, California.

It lies at an elevation of 2582 feet (787 m) in the Sierra Nevada foothills.

History
Yankee Jims was once one of the largest mining camps in Placer County during the California Gold Rush.  The Yankee Jim's post office operated from 1852 to 1940. The name comes from an Australian criminal who hid stolen horses at the site before gold was discovered there.

The town site is marked by California Historical Landmark #398, located on a ridge between the North and Middle forks of the American River.

Yankee Jims today is a small town composed simply of a cluster of homes. Its population was 18 in 2016.

See also
 California Historical Landmarks in Placer County, California

References

External links
 Californiagenealogy.org: Directory of the County of Placer County, California 1861 listing for Yankee Jims, Placer County, California.

Unincorporated communities in Placer County, California
California Historical Landmarks
Mining communities of the California Gold Rush
Populated places in the Sierra Nevada (United States)
Populated places established in 1852
1852 establishments in California
History of Placer County, California
Unincorporated communities in California